The 2017 Boston Breakers season was the club's twelfth season overall, eighth consecutive season, and fifth season as a member of the National Women's Soccer League. They finished 9th in the 10 team league with a record of 4 wins, 13 losses, and 7 draws.

Players and coaches

Coaching staff

Players

Mid-Season Roster Transactions
On June 21, it was announced the team re-signed goalkeeper Libby Stout as a keeper replacement for the injured Abby Smith.  Stout has previously been initially waived by the team on May 10.
On June 30, 2017, the Breakers waived defender Kylie Strom from the roster, and picked up forward Katie Stengel from waivers, who was released on June 28 by the Washington Spirit.

Pre-Season

Regular season

Results summary

League standings

2017 Supporters Award 

In 2017 the official supporters group of the Boston Breakers, The Boston Armada, began a tradition of awarding one player at each home game with a supporters award.  This award recognizes a player's individual contribution to the team during the match.

The trophy for 2017 is representative of the unofficial mascot of the Boston Breakers, "Chunk", a British Bulldog owned by team President of Soccer Operations and Development, Lee .

References

See also 
 2017 National Women's Soccer League season
 2017 in American soccer

2017 National Women's Soccer League season
American soccer clubs 2017 season
Boston Breakers seasons
2017 in sports in Massachusetts